Saurikh is a nagar panchayat in Kannauj district in the Indian state of Uttar Pradesh.  Its old name was Sau-Rishi.It is located near main industrial and educational hub of Dibiyapur which is around at a distance of 55 km from the town.

Demographics
Saurikh is a nagar panchayat in Kannauj District of Uttar Pradesh State, India. Saurikh Tehsil Headquarters is in the town Saurikh Rural. It belongs to the Kanpur Division.
As of 2001 census of India Saurikh had 5 sq/km area housing a population of 25,155. Males constitute 53% of the population and females 47%. Saurikh has an average literacy rate of 60%, more than the national average of 59.5%: male literacy is 68%, and female literacy is 56%.

Cuisine 
Saurikh is mainly famous for the sweet chamcham. It is popularly known all over the Kannauj District.

Festivals and carnivals

Hindu festivals 

According to Hindu calendar Vikram Samvat lunar calendar chaitra is considered as first month. Other Hindu festivals celebrated include Navaratri and Rama Navami,. Rakshabandhan, Deepawali, and Holi.

Muslim festivals 
The Muslim calendar begins with the month of Muharram.
Other Muslim festivals celebrated include Mawlid, Eid-ul-Fitr, and Bakra Eid.

Sikh festivals 
The birth of the Guru Gobind Singh Ji is celebrated as Prakash Utsav in the town as it is celebrated in other parts of country by the Sikh community.

Colleges
Bahuuddasiya Sewa Shikhsa Sansthan Girls Degree College, Saurikh
Chaudhary Jamadar Singh Mahila Degree College, Saurikh
 Ganga Singh Mahvidyalaya, Saurikh
Cjs Mahila degree college tirwa road, Saurikh
Rishi bhumi inter college
Pratibha nikhar shiksha niketan inter college
 Aasha devi Mahila degree college
 Aadarsh bal vikas vidhalaya
P.D Girls college
Sunrise Academy Csb road 
Gyan jyoti public school
 maa saraswati vidhya mandir
Saraswati Gyan mandir
St Mary School
Abrar Husain Inter College Abrar Nagar
Madarsa Hayatul Uloom Thane ke Samne

Nearby districts
Farrukhabad 45 km 
Kannauj 48 km
Mainpuri 55 km
Etawah 61 km
Auraiya 65 km

References

Cities and towns in Kannauj district